Alan Curtis may refer to:

 Alan Curtis (American actor) (1909–1953), American film actor
 Alan Curtis (author) (born 1943), American social scientist, public policy advisor and author
 Alan Curtis (British actor) (1930–2021), English actor and cricket announcer
 Alan Curtis (footballer) (born 1954), former Welsh international footballer
 Alan Curtis (harpsichordist) (1934–2015), American harpsichordist, musicologist, and conductor

See also
 Allen Curtis (1877–1961), American film director
 Allen Hiram Curtiss (1845–1907), botanist in the United States